Justine Zulu (born 11 August 1989) is a Zambian international footballer who plays for Red Arrows, as a midfielder.

Club career
Born in Lusaka, Zulu has played club football for National Assembly, Hapoel Be'er Sheva, Hapoel Bnei Lod, Hapoel Rishon LeZion, Enosis Neon Paralimni, Lamontville Golden Arrows, Kabwe Warriors, ZESCO United, Young Africans and Red Arrows.

In July 2012, he signed a three-year deal with the South African side Lamontville Golden Arrows. In October 2013, he returned to Zambian League for Kabwe Warriors, signing on a short-term deal. He joined ZESCO United ahead of the 2014 season.

International career
He made his international debut for Zambia in 2011. Zulu was a member of the provisional squad at the 2012 Africa Cup of Nations, but did not make the final 23 players.

References

1989 births
Living people
Zambian footballers
Zambia international footballers
National Assembly F.C. players
Hapoel Be'er Sheva F.C. players
Hapoel Bnei Lod F.C. players
Hapoel Rishon LeZion F.C. players
Enosis Neon Paralimni FC players
Lamontville Golden Arrows F.C. players
Kabwe Warriors F.C. players
ZESCO United F.C. players
Young Africans S.C. players
Red Arrows F.C. players
Liga Leumit players
Israeli Premier League players
Cypriot First Division players
Association football midfielders
Zambian expatriate footballers
Zambian expatriate sportspeople in Israel
Expatriate footballers in Israel
Zambian expatriate sportspeople in Cyprus
Expatriate footballers in Cyprus
Zambian expatriate sportspeople in South Africa
Expatriate soccer players in South Africa
Zambian expatriate sportspeople in Tanzania
Expatriate footballers in Tanzania
Tanzanian Premier League players